Daniel Oliver Morton (November 8, 1815 – December 5, 1859) was a lawyer from Toledo, Ohio who was a United States Attorney and Mayor of Toledo.

Education
Daniel Oliver Morton was born November 8, 1815 at Shoreham, Vermont, son of Rev. Daniel Oliver Morton (1788–1852) and Lucretia Parsons Morton (1789–1862). He was the oldest of six children of the couple, including his brother, Vice President Levi P. Morton. He graduated with honors from Middlebury College in the class of 1833. He removed to Cleveland, Ohio and studied law in the offices of Hiram V. Willson & Henry B. Payne.

Professional
After admission to the bar, Morton moved to Toledo, Ohio where he practiced. A Democrat, he served on the Toledo City Council and as City Attorney before serving as Mayor of Toledo from 1849 to 1850. Morton was also appointed a Master Commissioner in Chancery for the courts of Lucas County. In 1852 and 1853, Morton was one of three Commissioners on Practice and Pleadings who reformed Ohio's Code of Civil Procedure. He was appointed United States Attorney for the District of Ohio in 1854 by Franklin Pierce.

Personal life
Morton was married to Elizabeth A. Tyler (1817-1873) on December 31, 1839 at Ohio City, Ohio. They had seven children at Toledo, four of whom died in childhood. He died December 5, 1859 at Toledo, and was buried there.

References

Bibliography

1815 births
1857 deaths
Mayors of Toledo, Ohio
Middlebury College alumni
United States Attorneys for the District of Ohio
United States Attorneys for the Northern District of Ohio
Ohio Democrats
People from Shoreham, Vermont
19th-century American politicians
Morton family (United States)